For the Summer Olympics, there were 43 venues starting with the letter "B".

References

 List B